Korfball is a ball sport, with similarities to netball and basketball. It is played by two teams of eight players with four female players and four male players in each team.

The sport was invented by Dutch school teacher Nico Broekhuysen in 1902. In the Netherlands there are approximately 500 clubs and more than 90,000 people playing korfball. The sport is also played in Belgium and Taiwan, and in nearly 70 other countries.

History 

In 1902 Nico Broekhuysen, a Dutch school teacher from Amsterdam, was sent to Nääs, a town in Sweden, to follow an educational course about teaching gymnastics to children. This is where he was introduced to the Swedish game "ringboll". In ringboll one could score points by throwing the ball through a ring that was attached to a 3 m pole. Men and women played together, and the field was divided into three zones. Players could not leave their zone.

When Broekhuysen returned to Amsterdam he decided to teach his students a similar game. Broekhuysen also simplified the rules so that children could understand and play the game. Thus korfball was born. The main idea was the same as ringboll, but the new sport now stood on its own.

The oldest still existing korfball club never to have merged with any other club is a Dutch korfball club H.K.C. ALO from The Hague, Netherlands. H.K.C. ALO was founded on 1 February 1906.

Korfball was featured as a demonstration sport in the Summer Olympics of 1920 and 1928.

The International Korfball Federation was founded in 1933 in Antwerp, Belgium.

Korfball is played in 69 countries including the United States, China, England, Scotland, Ireland, Wales, Australia, New Zealand, Czech Republic, Slovakia, Poland, Ukraine, Greece, Serbia, South Africa, Zimbabwe, India, The Netherlands, Belgium, Nigeria, Morocco, Ghana, Russia, Germany, Taiwan, Turkey, Hong Kong, Portugal, Pakistan, India, Sweden, Hungary, Philippines, Indonesia, Italy, Spain, France and Romania.

In response to the 2022 Russian invasion of Ukraine, on March 1, 2022, the International Korfball Federation announced that the Russian Korfball Federation would not be invited until further notice to any international korfball competition. This implied effectively that no Russian athletes shall take part in any international korfball event.  Furthermore, the Russian Korfball Federation shall not be eligible to bid for the hosting of any IKF event until further notice, and no IKF events were planned in Russia.

It is growing in popularity in the U.K., and is referenced in a song by the band Half Man Half Biscuit entitled "Joy in Leeuwarden (We Are Ready)" on their 2011 album 90 Bisodol (Crimond).

Korfball has been played in the World Games since 1985. IKF World Korfball Championships have been held every four years since 1978. The leading nations are the Netherlands, Chinese Taipei, and Belgium.

Hong Kong hosted its first international tournament, the IKF Asia Oceania Korfball Championship, in 2006. New Zealand hosted the IKF Asia Oceania Youth Korfball Championships in 2007.

Rules and regulations

Equipment 

Korfball is played inside in winter and outdoors in spring, summer and autumn.

The court is divided into halves called zones. This is positioned two-thirds of the distance between the center line and the back of the zone.

The ball is very similar to the one used in association football, with a circumference of 68.0-70.5 cm (or diameter of 21.75-22.45 cm), a weight of 445-475 grams, and a bounce height of 1.10-1.30 meters when dropped from a height of 1.80 meters.

Team 
A korfball team consists of eight players: four female and four male.

Match 

An international korfball match typically consists of two halves or four periods, with the length varying depending on the competition. When the match consists of halves, the duration is typically 25 minutes, with periods typically between 7 and 10 minutes, with a one-minute break between the first and second periods and between the third and fourth periods. At half time the break is five or ten minutes.

Four players of each team are in one zone and the other four are in the other zone. Within each zone, a player may only defend a member of the opposite team of the same gender.

At the beginning of the match, one team chooses a particular half of the court. That half will be that team's defending zone, with "their" basket in it. Players score by throwing the ball through the opposing team's basket. After two goals, the teams change zones: defenders become attackers and attackers become defenders. In between those zone-changes, attackers cannot set foot on their defending zone or vice versa. At half time the teams swap halves of the court.

The rules prevent physical strength dominating the game. Blocking, tackling, and holding are not allowed, nor is kicking the ball.

Once a player has the ball, that player cannot dribble or walk with it; however, the player can move one foot as long as the foot on which the player landed when catching the ball stays in the same spot. Therefore, tactical and efficient teamwork is required, because players need each other in order to keep the ball moving.

A player may not attempt to score when defended, which occurs when the defender is in between the opponent and the basket, is facing his/her opponent, or is within arm's length and attempting to block the ball. This rule encourages fast movement while also limiting the impact of players' height compared to their opponents.

International tournaments

World Games

The national teams competition organized by the International World Games Association has been played roughly every four years since 1981.

IKF World Korfball Championship

The national teams competition organized by the International Korfball Federation has been played roughly every four years since 1978.

IKF U23 World Korfball Championship 

 2008 Kaohsiung, Taiwan – Winner: Netherlands
 2012 Barcelona, Catalonia, Spain – Winner: Netherlands
 2016 Olomouc, Czech Republic – Winner: Netherlands

Continental championships 
IKF promotes four continental championships: European Korfball Championship, All-Africa Korfball Championship, Pan-American Korfball Championship and Asia-Oceania Korfball Championship.

Europa Cup for Clubs 

Every year the IKF organises the Europa Cup for national champions (clubs). The Europa Cup was organized for the first time in 1967, and was won by Ons Eibernest from the Netherlands. The winner of the last edition was Fortuna/Delta Logistiek, which won the 2020 edition.

PKC from Papendrecht, the Netherlands, have won the championship the most times, a record 12 wins in total.

Until now, the winning team was either from the Netherlands or Belgium, with respectively 45 and 6 Europa Cups. The only club from the United Kingdom to reach the final was Mitcham Korfball Club from London. Mitcham lost the final against Catbavrienden from Belgium in 1998.

Beach korfball
For beach korfball, the rules of the game differ slightly from those of regular korfball. Each team has 4 starting players and up to 4 substitutes. The field of play is 20 metres by 10 metres, and goals are to be placed 4 metres from the end line. Matches consist of two halves of 6 minutes with a 1-minute rest.

Each team has 4 players in the field, two men and two women.  Players can be substituted at any time. 
Furthermore, if a goal is scored from a 2-point zone, a two-point goal is awarded. Free shots can both be executed at the standard Free Shot line, or at the spot where the fault was made by the opponent.

The current Beach Korfball World Champion is Poland, who won the World Beach Korfball Championship in Nador, Morocco in 2022. 13 teams were represented with Portugal taking silver and Belgium bronze.

Cultural references
Korfball is the theme of the song "Joy in Leeuwarden (We Are Ready)" on the album 90 Bisodol (Crimond) by Half Man Half Biscuit.

See also 
 British Student Korfball Nationals
 Commonwealth Korfball Championships
 Korfball Europa Shield
 Korfball European Bowl

References

External links 

 International Korfball Federation (IKF) includes rules, all national associations and event results.
   Extensive description and explanation of rules and requirements in competition korfball. 
 Infographic about what korfball is
 PNW Beach Korfball (US)

 
Articles containing video clips
Ball games
Forms of basketball
Games and sports introduced in 1902
Hybrid sports
Mixed-sex sports
Sports originating in the Netherlands
Team sports